St Anne's Church is in Church Road, Singleton, Lancashire, England. It is an active Anglican parish church in the deanery of Poulton, the archdeaconry of Lancaster, and the Diocese of Blackburn. Its benefice is united with those of St Chad, Poulton, and St Hilda, Carleton. It is recorded in the National Heritage List for England as a designated Grade II listed building.

History

The church was built to replace an earlier church that had been demolished in 1859. It was paid for by Thomas Miller, a Preston mill owner, who had purchased the Singleton estate. It was built between 1859 and 1860, and designed by the Lancaster architect E. G. Paley.  In 1938–39 the successors on Paley's practice, now known as Austin and Paley, added a vestry at a cost of £775.  The church was designated as a Grade II listed building on 11 June 1986. Grade II listing is for buildings that are "nationally important and of special interest".

Architecture
The church designed in the Early English style. It is constructed of sandstone rubble and has a slate roof. The plan consists of a nave, chancel, south transept and a steeple to the north-east. There are no aisles. The steeple has angled buttresses and is topped by a broach spire. The authors of the Buildings of England series express the opinion that the steeple is "well-proportioned". The windows have plate tracery; most are two-light and there are four-light dormers at the east end of the nave. The chancel has a wagon roof. Inside the church are monuments to the Miller family of Singleton Hall.

Organ
The organ was installed c 1875, and built by the Huddersfield-based  Peter Conacher. It is positioned in South chancel, and has a pleasing pipe rack. The instrument consists of two manuals and a radiating pedal board.

Pedal Keys 30 1 Bourdon 16

Great Keys 56 
             2 Open Diapason 8 
             3 Stop Diapason 8 
             4 Salicional 8 
             5 Principal 4 
             6 Flute 4

Swell Keys 56 Enclosed
             7 Flute d'Amour 8 
             8 Gamba 8 
             9 Voix Celeste 8 
             10 Gemshorn 4 
             11 Cornopean

Couplers
Swell to Pedal
Swell to Great
Great to Pedal

Organists
Tony Brindle-Wills 2008 to present
Christopher Robinson 1998 - 2008
Others to be added following research

Choir
The church currently has a small choir of 6. In years gone by, the church had a full SATB robed choir. A visiting choir called "The Occasional Singers", regularly visit the church to perform at weddings and funerals. The church has over 20 weddings a year.

Bell Tower
The church does not have a resident group of bell-ringers. However, a group of bell-ringers from Kirkham attend the church for weddings.

External features
The church lychgate listed at Grade II. It is constructed of timber with a red tile roof. An inscription reads "". The churchyard contains the war graves of two soldiers of World War I.

See also

 Listed buildings in Singleton, Lancashire
 List of ecclesiastical works by E. G. Paley

References
Citations

Sources

 
 

Church of England church buildings in Lancashire
Diocese of Blackburn
Grade II listed churches in Lancashire
Anne's, Singleton
Church buildings by E. G. Paley
Gothic Revival church buildings in England
Gothic Revival architecture in Lancashire
Churches completed in 1860
19th-century Church of England church buildings
Singleton, Lancashire